The name Joanne has been used for four tropical cyclones in the eastern Pacific Ocean.
 Tropical Storm Joanne (1961)
 Hurricane Joanne (1968)
 Hurricane Joanne (1972)
 Tropical Storm Joanne (1976)

See also 
 List of storms named Joan, a similar name used in other basins.

Pacific hurricane set index articles